Jerry Darnell (born November 27, 1962) is an American retired educator and Republican politician. He is a current member of the Mississippi House of Representatives, serving since 2020.

Biography 
Jerry Darnell was born on November 27, 1962, in Memphis, Tennessee. He graduated from Coldwater High School. He received a B. A. in elementary education and a master's degree in educational leadership from the University of Mississippi. In 2020, he was elected to represent the 28th district in the Mississippi House of Representatives.

References 

1962 births
Living people
Republican Party members of the Mississippi House of Representatives
People from Hernando, Mississippi